David Tukatahi Dixon (born January 5, 1969) is a former American football guard who played eleven professional seasons in the National Football League (NFL) and was the second Maori to play in professional football after Riki Ellison. He also earned a Super Bowl ring as part of the practice squad for the Dallas Cowboys, though practice squad players did not receive an actual ring. Dixon attended Arizona State University after transferring from Ricks College in Idaho.  He first played American football in college after being an active rugby player. He represented New Zealand in rugby at High School level in 1985. Dixon wore the number 71 while playing and starting for the Vikings as an Offensive Lineman. David had two stints with The Vikings with the second lasting 10 years (1994 to 2004). He was known as a vital part of the team's Offensive unit, and retired in 2004 after sustaining several injuries.

Dixon's daughter TeTori plays for the United States women's national volleyball team, and also was a key player for Burnsville (High School) in Minnesota.

References

External links
 NFL.com player page
 

1969 births
Living people
People from Papakura
New Zealand players of American football
American football offensive guards
Arizona State Sun Devils football players
Minnesota Vikings players
Rugby union players that played in the NFL